Edar or EDAR may refer to:

Edar (Bible), a tower
Ectodysplasin A receptor, a protein
E.D.Ar., an abbreviation for the United States District Court for the Eastern District of Arkansas